Jaqueline Ribeiro dos Santos Almeida (born 23 January 2002), known as Jaqueline Ribeiro or just Jaqueline, is a Brazilian professional footballer who plays as a forward for Corinthians.

Club career

Born in Guarulhos, São Paulo, Jaqueline began her career with the futsal team of Palmeiras in 2013. In the following year, she moved to São Caetano, where she played futsal along with football.

Jaqueline made her senior debut with Portuguesa in 2016, aged 16. In the following year, she joined Santos, featuring in only one league match during her first year as the club won the Série A1.

Ahead of the 2019 season, Jaqueline signed for São Paulo as the club was reactivating their women's senior side, and helped in their promotion from the Série A2 as champions; on 28 December 2019, she renewed her contract for a further year. After being named the breakthrough player in the 2020 Série A1, she left Tricolor on 27 December 2021.

On 5 January 2022, Jaqueline was announced at Corinthians.

International career
After representing Brazil at under-17 and under-20 levels, Jaqueline made her full international debut on 5 September 2022, starting in a 6–0 friendly routing of South Africa in Durban.

Jaqueline scored her first international goal on 7 October 2022, netting Brazil's fourth in a 4–1 win over Norway in Oslo.

Career statistics

International

International goals
Scores and results list Brazil's goal tally first, score column indicates score after each Jaqueline goal.

Honours
Santos
Campeonato Brasileiro de Futebol Feminino Série A1: 2017

São Paulo
Campeonato Brasileiro de Futebol Feminino Série A2: 2019

Corinthians
Supercopa do Brasil de Futebol Feminino: 2022
Campeonato Brasileiro de Futebol Feminino Série A1: 2022
: 2022

References

2000 births
Living people
People from Guarulhos
Footballers from São Paulo (state)
Brazilian women's footballers
Women's association football forwards
Campeonato Brasileiro de Futebol Feminino Série A1 players
Santos FC (women) players
São Paulo FC (women) players
Sport Club Corinthians Paulista (women) players
Brazil women's international footballers